Momentum is the first EP by American rapper Stevie Stone. The EP was released on October 23, 2012, by Strange Music. The album features guest appearances from Kutt Calhoun and Spaide Ripper. The album debuted at number 196 on the Billboard 200 chart.

Commercial performance
The album debuted at number 196 on the Billboard 200 chart, with first-week sales of 2,400 copies in the United States.

Track listing

Charts

References

2012 EPs
Stevie Stone albums
Strange Music EPs